William Mears may refer to:

 William Mears (politician) (19th century), Illinois Attorney General
 William Mears (publisher) (1686–?), English publisher and entrepreneur